Shemshad Sara (also Romanized as Shemshād Sarā) is a village in Rahimabad Rural District, Rahimabad District, Rudsar County, Gilan Province, Iran. At the 2006 census, its population was 190, in 43 families.

References 

Populated places in Rudsar County